Novosphingobium  fluoreni  is a Gram-negative, fluorene-degrading, rod-shaped and non-spore-forming bacterium from the genus Novosphingobium which has been isolated rice seeds from Jiansanjiang in China.

References

External links
Type strain of Novosphingobium fluoreni at BacDive -  the Bacterial Diversity Metadatabase	

Bacteria described in 2015
Sphingomonadales